The Stolpersteine in the Plzeňský kraj lists the Stolpersteine in the Plzeň Region  in the western part of Bohemia. Stolpersteine is the German name for stumbling blocks collocated all over Europe by German artist Gunter Demnig. They remember the fate of the Nazi victims being murdered, deported, exiled or driven to suicide.

Generally, the stumbling blocks are posed in front of the building where the victims had their last self-chosen residence. The name of the Stolpersteine in Czech is: Kameny zmizelých, stones of the disappeared.

The lists are sortable; the basic order follows the alphabet according to the last name of the victim.

Horažďovice 
First written reference indicates that ten Jewish families were living in the town in 1618. A Jewish cemetery existed since 1619. The original Horažd'ovice Synagogue, built in 1684, was destroyed by the Great Fire of 1868. A new synagogue was built on the same site. In 1901, the synagogue underwent a major renovation. Jakub Kohn, a prominent Horažd'ovice trader, bought the interior furnishings of the Synagogue of Polish Jews in Vienna and brought it to his hometown. Last Rabbi of Horažďovice was Martin Friedmann (1887–1931), from 1931 until 1941 there was only a lay leader, Adolf Popper, in this city.

During the Nazi rule in Czechoslovakia the synagogue was used as a storehouse. The ten Torah scrolls from the synagogue were rescued by London's Westminster Synagogue in 1964. The Memorial Scrolls Trust repaired them and loans them to synagogues throughout the world so that they can commemorate the perished Jewish communities of Bohemia. Westminster Synagogue also has produced a book about Horažďovice's Jewish community and its fate. Their members visited Horažďovice with Shlomo Fischl, the last living holocaust survivor of Horažďovice. He guided the group and gave first-hand testimony of the deportations to Theresienstadt on 26 November 1942, recorded on video by Westminster Synagogue. In 1980, the synagogue was destroyed by the Communist regime.

Today, not a single Jew is living in the city.

Plzeň 

The Jewish community of Plzeň was established in the 14th century, as one of the first in Bohemia. The first record of the community is a decree of Charles IV from 1338,  in which the administrators of the town were ordered to protect the Jews. The community built a synagogue, and, in 1432, bought land for a cemetery. For a long period, there was peaceful cooperation and trade between Jews and Christians — until 1504, when charges of desecration of hosts led to the expulsion of all Jews from Plzeň. Nevertheless, some Jews managed to settle in the town in the early 19th century illegally. In 1821 a total of 32 resided in Plzeň without permit. This changed drastically in 1848, when the Austrian monarch lifted residence restrictions for Jews in the whole empire. Now, Jews came back to attend the Plzeň markets and to officially take residence in the town. By 1854, the Jewish population of the town had jumped to 249. In 1856, a Jewish cemetery was consecrated. In 1859, a synagogue was inaugurated. In spite of anti-Jewish riots of 1866, the Jewish population continued to grow — and reached the number 1,207 in 1870. At the beginning of the 20th century the Jewish community of Plzeň was among the largest and most affluent in Bohemia. It could afford to construct a large synagogue in the Moorish style, built in 1893, called the Great Synagogue. The first lodge of Bnai Brith in Bohemia was founded in town.

Since 1918, the community employed two rabbis, one for Czech services, the other one for German language services. The community was quite diverse then, ideologically the Jews of Plzeň were split into three groups, the Czech nationalist Jews, the German assimilationists and the Zionists. In 1920, a severe and years-long controversy on kosher slaughtering broke out, when it was declared illegal for humanitarian reasons. Although the Supreme Court abolished this kind of prohibition in 1934, attempts to reintroduce Shechita failed, due to the price difference. In 1921, the Jews of Plzeň numbered 3,117. But thereafter the Jews population declined to 2,773 in 1930  (2.4% of the total population). After the annexation of Sudetenland by Hitler's Reich in the fall of 1938, many Jews from these regions arrived in the city. They felt in safety, but this changed drastically when Hitler Germany invaded the rest of Bohemia and Moravia in March 1939. The so-called Nuremberg Laws were also put in effect in the so-called Protectorate, Jews in Plzeň were gradually deprived of their civil rights and liberties, their social status, their property and employment. They were treated like inferiors and exposed to degrading repressions on administrative, psychological and physical levels.

In January 1942, at least two thousand of Plzeò citizens of all professions, all social classes and all ages (workers, craftsmen, tradesmen, bankers, lawyers, teachers, physicians, officials, housewives, children and elderly persons) were interned in the Sokol building in Štruncovy Sady and deported from town after several days. They were labelled "Jews" by the Nazis on the basis of their genealogical origin — not considering their faith nor their national or denominational feeling. They were forced to wear the yellow badge on the left side of the coats. Also interned and then deported were 540 Jews from nearby areas  – men, women and children from Blovice, Hořovice, Kralovice, Manětín, Radnice, Rokycany and Zbiroh. The three deportation trains left Plzeò railway station within ten days, their destination was Theresienstadt concentration camp:

 17 January: transport T with 1,000 deportees (murdered: 927, survived: 73).
 22 January: transport S with 1,004 deportees (murdered: 937, survived: 67).
 26 January: transport T with 609 deportees (murdered: 543, survived: 66).

The Pilsen deportation trains with 2,613 persons were among the first to arrive in Theresienstadt. The youngest was Eva Fischerová, eight months old, the oldest was Marie Ebenová from Rokycany, nearly 90. Most of the deportees had to walk from the Bohušovice railway station about two and a half kilometers to the camp, carrying children and luggage in the severe cold. There, families were separated, the living conditions in the barracks were gruesome, the food scarce. By the end of 22 January people of old age perished, among them Marie Ebenová.

Already in March of the same year two transports, Aa and Ab, each containing 1,000 people, were sent from Thersienstadt to the Izbica Ghetto. 620 of them were men, women and children from the Pilsen region. Additional 700 persons from the region were deported to ghettos, concentration camps and extermination camps in eastern Poland, Belorussia, Estonia and Latvia. On 26 October 1942 the first transport to Auschwitz left the camp. By the end of the year, not even one-third of the deportees was alive. More than 1,800 men, women and children had been murdered within the first eleven months after deportation. Only 206 of the Pilsen deportees would survive the Shoah.

Today, a little more than 70 Jews live in Plzeň.

Sušice 

A Jewish settlement in Sušice was first mentioned in the second half of the 16th century. In 1626, a Jewish cemetery was founded, in 1660, a synagogue, was erected. During WW1 there was a decline in the Jewish community in Sušice and thereafter a rejuvenation. At the beginning of the 1930s the community numbered about 120 members, of which more than 90 were murdered during the Holocaust. In the late 1950s the old synagogue was replaced by a new one.

Dates of collocations 

The Stolpersteine in the Plzeňský kraj were collocated by the artist himself on the following dates:
 Horažďovice: 14 September 2014 (family Adler/Adlerová, Z. Mautner), 3 August 2015 and 3 August 2016 (10)
 Plzeň: 28 October 2012
 Sušice: 2 August 2015 (family Gutmann/Gutmannová) and 4 August 2016 (Borger/Fischer/Fischerová)

The Stolpersteine of Horažďovice were initiated by the Scrolls Committee of the Westminster Synagogue, chaired by Alberta Strage.

See also 
 List of cities by country that have stolpersteine
 Stolpersteine in the Czech Republic

External links

 stolpersteine.eu, Demnig's website
 holocaust.cz

References

Plzeňský kraj